Erwin Sietas (24 July 1910 – 20 July 1989) was a German swimmer who specialized in the 200 m breaststroke. He competed at the 1928, 1932 and 1936 Olympics and finished in fourth, fourth and second place, respectively. Sietas was known for his fast start; in 1932 and 1936 he led he race, but faded at the finish. He won three medals at the European championships, including a gold in 1934.

Between 1928 and 1936 Sietas won all national titles, and in 1935 set a world record in the 200 m breaststroke. He was the only European breaststroke swimmer to win an Olympic medal between 1928 and 1952. In 1992 he was inducted into the International Swimming Hall of Fame.

See also
 List of members of the International Swimming Hall of Fame
World record progression 200 metres breaststroke

References

1910 births
1989 deaths
Sportspeople from Hamburg
German male swimmers
German male breaststroke swimmers
Olympic swimmers of Germany
Swimmers at the 1928 Summer Olympics
Swimmers at the 1932 Summer Olympics
Swimmers at the 1936 Summer Olympics
Olympic silver medalists for Germany
World record setters in swimming
European Aquatics Championships medalists in swimming
Medalists at the 1936 Summer Olympics
Olympic silver medalists in swimming
20th-century German people